Judge Shipman may refer to:

Nathaniel Shipman (1828–1906), judge of the United States Court of Appeals for the Second Circuit
William Davis Shipman (1818–1898), judge of the United States District Court for the District of Connecticut